Kanjirathanam is a small town in Kottayam District, Kerala, India located between kuruppanthara and Kuravilangad.

Demographics
Kanjirathanam population primarily consists of Syrian Catholic Christians, but there is a small population of Hindus too. Mostly all household in this village have NRI (Non-Resident India) family members, the majority of them overseas (The United Kingdom, United States, Europe, Australia etc.).

History
Kanjirathanam is of historical importance due to a cave known as Puliala, literally meaning cave of leopard. The cave, which is made of laterite, got its name from an occurrence of finding a few leopard cubs at the mouth of the cave about 200 years ago. A commonly held local belief is that the cave have been used by local kings.

References

A malayalam video documentary.

Villages in Kottayam district